Richard Lawrence Hatch (May 21, 1945 – February 7, 2017) was an American actor, writer, and producer. Hatch began his career as a stage actor before moving on to television work in the 1970s. Hatch is best known for his role as Captain Apollo in the original Battlestar Galactica television series. He is also widely known for his role as Tom Zarek in the reimagined Battlestar Galactica.

Early life
Hatch was born on May 21, 1945, in Santa Monica, California, to John Raymond Hatch and Elizabeth Hatch (née White). He grew up with four siblings. While in high school, he aspired to become an athlete in pole vaulting, and only had a passing interest in acting, as he considered himself too shy and insecure. The assassination of President Kennedy in 1963, while Hatch had just started college, turned him towards acting; he had been enrolled in a required oral interpretation course at the time, and following the assassination, presented an article written about Kennedy upon which he said: "As I began to read this article, I got so affected by what I was saying that I forgot myself. I was expressing feelings and emotions I tended to keep locked inside of myself."

Career

Early work
Hatch began his theatrical career with the Los Angeles Repertory Theater, as well as shows in Chicago and Off-Broadway.

Television
Hatch began working in television in 1970 when he starred as Philip Brent in the daytime soap opera All My Children, a role he played for two years. In the following years, he made guest appearances in prime time series such as Cannon; Nakia; Barnaby Jones; Hawaii Five-O; and The Waltons; as well as appearing in several made-for-TV movies such as F. Scott Fitzgerald and 'The Last of the Belles' (1974) with Susan Sarandon;The Hatfields and the McCoys (1975) with Jack Palance; Addie and the King of Hearts (1976) with Jason Robards; and the 1978 television movie Deadman's Curve, in which he portrayed Jan Berry of the musical duo Jan and Dean, alongside Bruce Davison as Dean Torrence.

In 1976, Hatch gained his first major television role as Inspector Dan Robbins on the detective series The Streets of San Francisco, as the replacement for Michael Douglas, who had played Inspector Steve Keller in the series, but had resigned from the cast that year. Though the role was for only one season, Hatch won Germany's Bravo Youth Magazine Award for the role. Following this, he had a recurring role on the series Mary Hartman, Mary Hartman, also for one season in 1977.

In 1978, Hatch gained a starring role in Glen A. Larson's sci-fi series, Battlestar Galactica (1978), which aired for a single season before its high cost motivated its cancellation by ABC-TV. Hatch was nominated for a Golden Globe Award for the role. However, because Hatch held out for more money in the series' toy merchandizing with Mattel, his character was conspicuously absent in its action figure line, although Apollo would appear in subsequent revival Battlestar Galactica toylines over the decades.

Throughout the 1970s and 1980s, Hatch made guest appearances on such series as Hotel; Murder, She Wrote; The Love Boat (romantically opposite 20-year-old Teri Hatcher in her first on-screen speaking role); Fantasy Island; Baywatch; Dynasty; and MacGyver. In 1990, Hatch returned to daytime soap operas and appeared on Santa Barbara, originating the character Steven Slade.

In 2013, Hatch made a guest appearance in an adult-oriented episode of The Eric Andre Show on Cartoon Network's Adult Swim.

Films
Hatch made several low-key theatrical film releases, including Charlie Chan and the Curse of the Dragon Queen (1981) and Prisoners of the Lost Universe (1983). An abridged version of the pilot episode of Battlestar Galactica was released in cinemas, initially overseas and then for a limited run in the U.S., as was a sequel film, Mission Galactica: The Cylon Attack, which was also made from episodes of the series. He starred with Leif Garrett in Party Line (1988) and with Arte Johnson in Second Chance (1996).

Battlestar Galactica revival attempt

In the 1990s, Hatch attempted to revive Battlestar Galactica. He began writing novels based on the series, and also wrote, co-directed and executive-produced a trailer called Battlestar Galactica: The Second Coming in the hopes of enticing Universal Studios – the rights holders for the franchise – into producing a new series. Hatch's series would have been a direct continuation of the original 1978 series, and would have ignored the events of the failed spin-off Galactica 1980, in which Hatch had not appeared. Original actors John Colicos (Baltar), Terry Carter (Colonel Tigh) and Jack Stauffer (Bojay) appeared in the trailer with Hatch. Though the trailer won acclaim at science-fiction conventions, Universal was not interested in Hatch's vision for the revival of Battlestar Galactica, and instead opted for a remake rather than the sequel for which Hatch had campaigned. Hatch, who had reportedly remortgaged his own house to produce the trailer, was bitterly disappointed by this turn of events and was highly critical of the prospective new series.

In 2004, he stated to Sci-Fi Pulse that he had felt resentment over the failure of his planned Galactica continuation and was left "exhausted and sick... I had, over the past several years, bonded deeply with the original characters and story... writing the novels and the comic books and really campaigning to bring back the show."

Battlestar Galactica re-imagining

Despite his resentment, Hatch developed a respect for Ronald D. Moore, the remake show's head writer and producer, when Moore appeared as a featured guest at Galacticon (the Battlestar Galactica 25th anniversary convention, hosted by Hatch) and answered questions posed by a very hostile audience. Later, in 2004, Hatch was offered a recurring role in the new Battlestar Galactica series, which he accepted. He portrayed Tom Zarek, a terrorist turned politician who spent twenty years in prison for blowing up a government building. After Zarek's death, Hatch commented that "never did I play this character as a villain nor did I think he was one and I still feel that way," and that he considered the character to be a principled figure who is driven to violence after being "blocked in every way possible" by Roslin and Adama. "Zarek, Adama and Roslin all wanted power for the same reason, to make a positive difference."

Other work
Alongside his attempts to revive the original Battlestar Galactica, Hatch created a trailer for his own space opera entitled The Great War of Magellan.

Hatch appeared in InAlienable, a 2008 science-fiction film written and produced by Walter Koenig. In 2011, Hatch worked on a new reality TV series called Who the Frak?, which he created and appeared in as himself. The series was touted as "the world's first social network reality drama." In 2012–13, Hatch appeared in the web series The Silicon Assassin Project. In 2013, he ventured into the Steampunk genre, starring in the short film Cowboys & Engines alongside Malcolm McDowell and Walter Koenig. In 2014, he played the Klingon Commander Kharn in the Star Trek fan film Prelude To Axanar and was to appear in the subsequent fan production Star Trek: Axanar in 2015, though legal issues with Paramount Pictures prevented the project from being completed.

Writing
With various co-authors, Hatch wrote a series of seven tie-in novels set in the original Battlestar Galactica universe. The series included:
 Armageddon, published August 1, 1997,
  Warhawk, published September 1, 1998
  Resurrection, published July 1, 2001
  Rebellion, published July 1, 2002,
  Paradis, published July 1, 2003,
  Destiny, published June 29, 2004,
  Redemption, published November 25, 2005.

Armageddon and Warhawk were both written with Christopher Golden. Resurrection was written with Stan Timmons. Rebellion was written with Alan Rodgers. Paradis, Destiny, and Redemption were all written with Brad Linaweaver.

Death
Hatch died on February 7, 2017, of pancreatic cancer while he was under hospice care in Los Angeles, at age 71.

Final film
In his final film performance, Hatch played director Haskell Edwards in the film Diminuendo which wrapped a few months before he learned of his pancreatic cancer. Hatch was able to see a rough cut of the film before he died, and a work-in-progress screening was held as a memorial shortly after his death. Diminuendo had its world premiere at the 20th Annual Sarasota Film Festival on April 20, 2018.

Filmography

Film

 Best Friends (1975) - Jesse
 Deadman's Curve (1978, TV Biography) - Jan Berry of Jan and Dean
 Battlestar Galactica (1978) - Captain Apollo
 The Hustler of Muscle Beach (1980, TV Movie (ABC)) - Nick Demec
 Living Legend: The King of Rock and Roll (1980)
 Charlie Chan and the Curse of the Dragon Queen (1981) - Lee Chan, Jr.
 Prisoners of the Lost Universe (1983) - Dan
 Terror on London Bridge (1985) - Hoffman
 Last Platoon (1988) - Sgt. Chet Costa
 Party Line (1988) - Dan
 Ghetto Blaster (1989) - Travis
 Leathernecks (1989) - Lieutenant Caldwell
 Dark Bar (1989) - Marco
 Mal d'Africa (1990) - Tony La Palma
 Delta Force Commando II: Priority Red One (1990) - Delta Force Leader Brett Haskell
 Renaissance (1994) - Tristan Anderson
 Second Chance (1996) - Mitch
 Iron Thunder (1998) - Nelson
 Battlestar Galactica: The Second Coming (1999, Short) - Commander Apollo
 The Ghost (2001) - Edward
 Unseen Evil (2001) - Dr. Peter Jensen
 Big Shots (2001) - Casting Director
 The Rain Makers (2005) - Wyatt
 InAlienable (2008) - Dr. Eric Norris
 The Little Match Makers (2011) - Officer Candy
 Season of Darkness (2012) - Dr. Shaker
 Dead by Friday (2012) - Father Anthony
 Prelude to Axanar (2014, Short) - Commander Kharn
 Alongside Night (2014) - The Silicon Assassin
 Chatter (2015) - Nate Terry
 The Enchanted Cottage (2016) - Mr. Bradshaw
 Surge of Power: Revenge of the Sequel (2016) - Himself
 Asylum of Darkness (2017) - Dr. Shaker
 The Pod (2017) - Mike Gibson
 Diminuendo (2018) - Haskell Edwards

Television
 All My Children  (1970–1972) as Phil Brent (Erica Kane's second husband)
 The Sixth Sense - Gallows in the Wind (1972) as Owen Preston
 Barnaby Jones (1973) Season 1 Episode 5 "Perchance to Kill" as Eric Garvin
 Kung Fu (1973) "Sun and Cloud Shadow" as David
 The Waltons (1974 and 1975) as Wade Walton
 Cannon (1975) 5x05 "The Victim as Allen Farrell", 5x13 "The Star 1" and "The Star 2" as Terry Kane
 Addie and the King of Hearts (1976) as Mr. Davenport
 The Streets of San Francisco (1976–1977) Season 5, all 24 episodes, as Inspector Dan Robbins
 Jan and Dean (1978) as Jan Berry
 The Eric Andre Show (2013) as himself
 T. J. Hooker (1985) as Robert Marshall
 Hawaii Five-O (1973 and 1975)
 Battlestar Galactica (1978-79 TV series), all 21 episodes, as Captain Apollo 
 Murder, She Wrote (1984) Season 1 Episode 3 "Deadly Lady" as Terry Jones
 The Love Boat, Season 8 Episode 23, "Vicki's Gentleman Caller", "Partners to the End, "The Perfect Arrangement", 1985 as Tom Whitlaw, and Season 9 Episode 8.
 MacGyver (1986) Season 2 Episode 10 "Three for the Road" as Michael Talbot
 Battlestar Galactica (2004–2009) Season 1–4, 22 episodes, as Tom Zarek
 Blade of Honor (2017), five episodes as Admiral DiCarrek

References

External links

 
 
 
 
 
 
 Richard Hatch's Great War of Magellan
 Who the Frak is the Real Richard Hatch?
 Richard Hatch memorial on Destinies-The Voice of Science Fiction 

1945 births
2017 deaths
American male soap opera actors
American male stage actors
American male television actors
Writers from Santa Monica, California
Male actors from Santa Monica, California
Deaths from pancreatic cancer
Deaths from cancer in California